Hudson's Bay is a syndicated 1959 Western television series set in Canada, and filmed in black-and-white. The episodes follow the adventures of a Hudson’s Bay trader and his French-Canadian guide. Thirty-nine half-hour episodes were produced. Sidney J. Furie directed twenty-nine episodes, and Alvin Rakoff directed eight.

Synopsis
The series tells the fictional adventures of men connected to Canada’s Hudson’s Bay Company during the 1810s and 1820s. Episodes begin with an announcer stating: “Hudson’s Bay, the saga of the great Hudson’s Bay Fur Company and of the brave men who traveled the untracked wilderness. From Labrador to California, from Minnesota to Alaska. Starring Barry Nelson as Jonathon Banner, Hudson’s Bay man, with George Tobias as Pierre Falcon.”

Production
Thirty-eight episodes were produced by Northstar Productions, and filmed in Canada. The last episode was produced by Meridian Productions, and filmed in Hollywood. The series was distributed by United Artists Television.

Though the two main actors and the director of photography were from the United States, all others working on the series were either Canadian or British. Hudson’s Bay Company approved of the series, and lent furs to be used in fur trading scenes. Director Sidney J. Furie  stated "They realize it’s entertainment. They’re not standing over us the way the RCMP’s standing over their series." 

The series was produced for $30,000 an episode, at a time when the average of $50,000 an episode was spent for a  series. Four episodes were completed in two and a half weeks, averaging three days each.

Episodes

References

External links
Hudson's Bay in the Internet Movie Database
Wisconsin Center for Film  

Black-and-white Canadian television shows
English-language television shows
1950s Canadian drama television series